Lithosarctia hoenei is a moth of the subfamily Arctiinae. It was described by Franz Daniel in 1954. It is found in Yunnan, China.

References

 

Spilosomina
Moths described in 1954